This is a list of schools and universities in Aligarh, Uttar Pradesh, India.

School
 The Blossoms School, Muzammil Manzil, Aligarh
 Shri Rajendra Singh International School, Opposite Aasna Police Station, Mathura Road, Aligarh 
Al-Barkaat Public School, Anoopshahr Road, Aligarh (CBSE)
Aligarh Public School, AMU Road, Aligarh (also known as APS)(CBSE)
 J.P.S CONVENT Jr. HIGH SCHOOL, AGRA ROAD, Aligarh 
 Chauhan Indravati Inter College, Anoopshahar Road, Jawan Sikandarpur,(Aligarh) (Hindi Medium-UP Board)
 Delhi Public School DPS, Branch 1-Agra Road, Branch 2-Civil Lines, Ramghat Road, Aligarh (CBSE)
 Gurukul Public School, Somna Road, Khair, Aligarh
 Kendriya Vidyalaya, Ramghat Road, Aligarh (CBSE)
 Maharishi Vidya Mandir, Agra Road, Aligarh (CBSE)
 Our Lady of Fatima High School, Aligarh(often called as OLF), Ramghat Road, Aligarh (CBSE)
 Three Dots Sewamarg Public School, Ramghat Road, Aligarh ( formerly ICSE, currently CBSE)
 A.M.U ABK High School (Boys), Aligarh (AMU)
 A.M.U ABK High School (Girls), Aligarh (AMU)
 Raja Mahendra Pratap Singh A.M.U. City School (Boys), G T Road, Aligarh
 A.M.U Girls' School, Aligarh (AMU)
 Abdullah Nursery, Aligarh (AMU)
 Agrasen Inter College,harduaganj,Aligarh (Hindi Medium-UP Board)
 Ahmadi School for the Visually Challenged, Aligarh (AMU)
 Ayesha Tarin Modern Public School, Chherat, Aligarh (CBSE)
 B.L. Jain Inter College, Aligarh (Hindi Medium-UP Board)
 Blackdale Public School, Shafiabad, Aligarh (+2 CBSE)
 Brilliant Public High School, Shankar Vihar Quarsi, Aligarh (UP)
 City Girls High School (Qazi Para), Aligarh (AMU) 
 DAV inter college, Aligarh (Hindi Medium-UP Board)
 Dharam Samaj Bal Mandir(often called as DS Bal Mandir), Dubey Ka Parao, Aligarh (CBSE)
 Dharam Samaj Inter College,Dubbay Padao, Aligarh (Hindi Medium-UP Board)
 DPS World School, Palwal Road, Khair, Aligarh
 Dream India School, Ramghat Road, Aligarh 
 Eurokids Aligarh Vikram colony,Ramghat road, Aligarh.
 Faizul Uloom High School, Hamdard Nagar D, Aligarh
 Fatima Inter College Quarsi Bye Pass, Aligarh
 G D Public Sr. Sec. School, Khair Road, Aligarh (CBSE)
 Gagan Public School, Agra Road, Aligarh (ICSE)
 Gandhi junior high school, Khair, Aligarh
Gagan Public School, Near Exhibition Ground, Awaas Vikas Colony, Aligarh(CBSE)
Gagan Public School, Khair Road, Aligarh (CBSE) 
 GDSM Public School, Harduaganj, Aligarh
 Glorious Public school A.D.A Colony, Shahjamal Market, Aligarh
 Gold Mine Convent School, Etah Chungi,Aligarh
 Green Crescent Public School, Medical College Road, Aligarh 
 H.B. Inter College, G.T. Road, Aligarh (Hindi Medium-UP Board)
 H.V.N School, Khair, Aligarh
 H.V.N., Palwal Road, Khair, Aligarh
 Hare Krishna Public School, Senior Secondary (CBSE), Bhankari, Delhi GT Road, Aligarh
 Heritage International School, Aligarh (CBSE)
 Ibrahim International School,Iqra Colony,Aligarh
 Imperial International School, Aligarh
 Ingraham Institute Sr. Sec. English School, Sarsaul Chauraha, GT Road, Aligarh (CBSE)
 Iqra Public School, Quarsi Bypass Road (CBSE)
 J.P.S CONVENT Jr. HIGH SCHOOL,Sarai Burj, Agra Road, Aligarh
 Jagran Public School (JPS), Mathura Road (CBSE)
 Janta Inter College, Chherat, Aligarh (Hindi Medium-UP Board)
 J.S. Public School, Gonda Road, Aligarh (CBSE) 
 Ketan Convent Sr. Sec.School,GT Road, Aligarh (CBSE)
 Kingsway Public School, Sarvodaya Nagar, Ramghat Road, Aligarh (Play Group To KG)
 Krishna International School, Sarsaul, GT Road, Aligarh (CBSE)
 Krishna Public School,Ramghat Road, Aligarh 
 MASU Higher Secondary School Jamalpur, Aligarh
M.M. Presidency inter college, Khair Bypass Road, Aligarh (Hindi Medium-UP Board)
 Mother's Touch International School, Ramghat Road, Aligarh (CBSE)
 Nurture International School (Branch of City Montesori Lucknow), Talanagari, Aligarh (CBSE)
 Nurture International School, Aligarh (ICSE)
 P. K. M. Public School Maharaja Enclave, Khair, Aligarh ( Play Group To Eighth) 
 Panchsheel City School, Khair, Aligarh
 Parent's Pride School, Rambagh colony, Ramghat Road Aligarh
Pooja Public School, Near Exhibition Ground, Awaas Vikaas Colony, Aligarh(ICSE)
 Pt. Ganga Prasad Bhardwaj Inter College Shekhupur,Jalali, Aligarh(Hindi Medium-UP Board)
 Radiant Stars English School, Near Khereshwar Temple, Khair Road, Aligarh (CBSE) 

 Saiyyid Hamid Senior Secondary School (Boys), Aligarh (AMU)
 Senior Secondary School (Girls), Aligarh (AMU)
 Shaina Public School, Kela Nagar, Aligarh
 Shantiniketan World School, Talanagari, Aligarh (CBSE)
 Shivdan Singh Inter College,Iglas,Aligarh (Hindi Medium-UP Board)
 Shri Sher Singh Nayak Inter College, Nagla Banjara Raipur Khas, Aligarh (Hindi Medium-UP Board)
 SK Inter College, Jalali, Aligarh (Hindi Medium-UP Board)
 St. Fidelis School, Ramghat Road, Aligarh (CBSE)
 Syedna Tahir Saifuddin School (Minto Circle) Estd 1875 as Muhammadan Anglo-Oriental Collegiate School by Sir Syed Ahmad Khan in 1875(later developed into Aligarh Muslim University), AMU Circle, Aligarh
Tikaram Girl's Inter College, Ramghat Road, Aligarh (All girl's inter college affiliated to Hindi Medium-UP Board)
 Vatsalya World School, Sasni Gate, Aligarh
 Wisdom Public School, Quarsi, Aligarh (CBSE)
 Woodbines Floret Public School, Anoopshahr Road, Aligarh (CBSE)
 Yash Global School, Sabalpur Pisawa, Aligarh (CBSE)
 Zakir Husain Model Sr. Sec. School, Dodhpur (CBSE)

There are about 30 UP Board Inter Colleges in the city also.

Universities
 Aligarh Muslim University, Aligarh (Central Govt. university)
 Mangalayatan University, Aligarh (Private University)
 Raja Mahendra Pratap Singh State University, Aligarh (State Govt. University)

Degree colleges
 Abdullah Girls College, AMU, Marris Road, Aligarh
 Dharam Samaj Post Graduation College, Near Ramlila Ground, Achal Taal Road, Aligarh ( formerly affiliated to Dr. Bhimrao Ambedkar University (Agra University), Agra. Now affiliated to Raja Mahendra Pratap University, Aligarh)(often known as DSPG College, listed amongst top 3 government colleges of Aligarh along with TR Girls College and SV College apart from AMU colleges)(Co-ed College)
 Sri  Varshney College,Near Ramlila Ground, Achal Taal Road, Aligarh (formerly affiliated to Agra University. Now affiliated to Raja Mahendra Pratap University,  Aligarh)(often known as SV College)(Co-ed college)
 Tikaram Girls College, Ramghat Road, Aligarh (formerly affiliated  to Agra University. Now affiliated to Raja Mahendra Pratap University,  Aligarh)(often known as TR College)(All Girls College)
 Gyan College, Agra Road, Aligarh (formely affiliated to Agra University. Now affiliated to Raja Mahendra Pratap University,  Aligarh)
 D.R. Group of Education, Sabalpur, Pisawa, Aligarh (formerly affiliated to B.R. Ambedkar University, Agra. Now affiliated to Raja Mahendra Pratap University,  Aligarh)
 Sir Ziauddin Dental College, AMU, Aligarh
 Jamia Urdu, Dodhpur, Aligarh
 Ajmal Khan Tibbiya College, AMU, Aligarh
 Chirnji Lal Girls Inter College, Aligarh
 Sanskrit Girls Int. Coolege, Aligarh
 Grah Nirman Samiti SSC, Aligarh
 Norngi Lal Govt. Inter College, Aligarh
 Govt. Girls Inter College, Aligarh
 S.M.B Intere College, Aligarh
 Raghuvir Sahay Inter College, Aligarh
 Hindu Inter College, Aligarh
 Uday Singh Jain Girls Inter College, Aligarh
 Champa Agrawal Girls Inter College, Aligarh
 Jagat Singh Tyagi S.S.C, Aligarh
 D.A.V Inter College, Aligarh
 Gopiram Paliwal Inter College, Aligarh
 Maheshwari Inter College, Aligarh
 Bihari Lal Inter College, Aligarh
 Maheshwari Girls Inter College, Aligarh
 Ratan Prem DAV Girls Inter College, Aligarh
 Subhash S.S.C, Aligarh
 H.B Inter College, Aligarh
 Vivekanand Group of Institutes of Technology & Management, Law and Education(formerly affiliated to Agra University. Now affiliated to Raja Mahendra Pratap University,  Aligarh)

Engineering/Pharmacy colleges
 Vivekanada College Of Technology and Management, Aligarh(Vivekanand Group of Colleges, affiliated to AKTU, Lucknow)
 IGNOU Aligarh Region, Marris Road, Aligarh
 Jawaharlal Nehru Medical College, AMU, Aligarh
 Dr.Ziauddin Ahmad Dental College, Medical Road, AMU Campus, Aligarh
 Aligarh Unani & Ayurvedic Medical College - HT Campus, Aligarh
 Aligarh College of Engineerirng & Management, Anupshahr Road, Aligarh(affiliated to AKTU, Lucknow)
Dharam Samaj Pharmacy College (DSPG College Pharmacy Brach which esta. in 2020), Near Ramlila Ground, Achal Taal Road, Aligarh(AKTU college)
 Sri Sai Ayurvedic Medical College & Hospital (SAMC), Aligarh
 Zakir Hussain College of Engineering and Technology, AMU, Aligarh
 Shivdan Singh Engineering College, Mathura Road (UPTU College)
 IIMT, Talanagari, Aligarh (UPTU College)
 Aligarh College of Engineering and Technology, Sasni Gate on Mathura Road (UPTU College)
 ITM, Khair Road, Aligarh (UPTU College)
 SKDM Degree & Polytechnic College, Lodha, Aligarh
 PM College, Khair Road, Aligarh (Agra University College)
 Aligarh College of Pharmacy, Aligarh (UPTU College)
 ACN College of Engineering and Management Studies, Kasimpur Road, Aligarh (UPTU College)
 Jamia-Al-Barkaat, Anoopshahr Road, Near Jamalpur Railway Crossing, Aligarh
 Jamia Urdu, Dodhpur, Aligarh
 Aligarh College of Engineering and Technology, Aligarh
 SSLD Varshney Girls Engineering College, GT Road Aligarh
 Vision Institute of Technology, Aligarh
 Sri Sri Institute of Technology and Management, Aligarh

Polytechnic/ITI institutes
 Vivekananda College of Technology and Management, (AKTU College), Aligarh.
 A.D.R.S. Institute of Technology and Management, Gabhana, Aligarh
 Dulari Devi Institute of Pharmacy, Chandaus, Khair, UP, India
 Institute of Technology and Management, Khair Road, Aligarh
 Mahalvar Institute of Technology, Gram-Jakhariya Station Road Atrauli, Aligarh
 R.G.M. Institute of Technology and Management, Aligarh
 Gaurav I.T.I, Aligarh
 S.K.D.M Polytechnic College, Khair, Aligarh
 University Polytechnic College, Aligarh Muslim University, Aligarh
 Women's Polytechnic College, Aligarh Muslim University, Aligarh

Law Colleges
 Vivekananda College Of Law, Aligarh(Vivekanand Group of Colleges, formerly affiliated to Agra University.  Now affiliated to Raja Mahendra Pratap University,  Aligarh)
 Law Faculty, Aligarh Muslim University, Aligarh
Dharam Samaj Post Graduation College (Law Branch), Near Ramlila Ground, Achal Taal Road, Aligarh(formerly affiliated to Agra University.  Now affiliated to Raja Mahendra Pratap University,  Aligarh)

Aligarh
 
Uttar Pradesh education-related lists